Orphinus fulvipes is a species of carpet beetle in the family Dermestidae. It is found in North America, South Asia, Oceania, and Europe.

Description
Total body length is 2.5 mm. Pronotal integument is dark brown. Elytral integument and scutellum entirely brown and clothed with brownish pubescence. Antennae pale yellowish-brown.

References

Further reading

 
 

Dermestidae
Articles created by Qbugbot
Beetles described in 1838